Kalateh-ye Abdol (also Romanized as Kalāteh-ye ‘Abdol) is a village in Forumad Rural District, in the Central District of Meyami County, Semnan Province, Iran. At the 2006 census, its population was 68, in 15 families.

References 

Populated places in Meyami County